Suslov is a Russian masculine surname, its feminine counterpart is Suslova. Notable people with the surname include:

Elena Suslova (born 1984), Russian football defender
Iryna Suslova (born 1988), Ukrainian politician
Kirill Suslov (born 1991), Russian football defender
Mikhail Suslov (1902–1982), Soviet statesman 
Nadezhda Suslova (1843–1918), Russian physician
Nikolay Suslov (born 1969), Russian film producer and writer
Oleh Suslov (born 1969), Ukrainian football player
Polina Suslova (1839–1918), Russian short story writer, sister of Nadezhda
Tomáš Suslov (born 2002), Slovak football player
Vladimir Suslov
 Vladimir Antonovich Suslov (born 1939), Russian politician
 Vladimir Vasilyevich Suslov (1857–1921), Russian architect

Russian-language surnames